The 1980 SEC men's basketball tournament took place on February 27 – March 1, 1980, in Birmingham, Alabama, at the Birmingham–Jefferson Convention Complex. The LSU Tigers, who represent Louisiana State University, won the tournament by beating the Kentucky Wildcats in the championship game. LSU also received the SEC’s automatic bid to the 1980 NCAA tournament.

Bracket

All-Tournament Team 
F—DeWayne Scales, LSU*
C—Sam Bowie, Kentucky
F—Durand Macklin, LSU
G—Kyle Macy, Kentucky
F—John Stroud, Ole Miss

See also 
Southeastern Conference
SEC tournament

References 

SEC men's basketball tournament
1979–80 Southeastern Conference men's basketball season
1980 in sports in Alabama
Basketball competitions in Birmingham, Alabama
College basketball tournaments in Alabama